Texas Central or Texas Central Partners, LLC, is a private railroad company that is proposing a high-speed rail line between Dallas/Fort Worth and Houston. It plans to use technology based on that used by the Central Japan Railway Company and trains based on the N700S Series Shinkansen. The company has indicated that the journey time would be less than 90 minutes, with service beginning as early as 2026.

Company 
Lone Star High-Speed Rail LLC was founded in 2009, changing its name to Texas Central Railway in 2012. Texas Central Partners, LLC (TCP), was founded on September 24, 2013, as the company to build and operate the service, with the rail line itself owned by the separate Texas Central Railway (TCR). Texas Central Partners is working with the Federal Railroad Administration (FRA) and TxDOT to develop the Environmental Impact Statement required by NEPA. In July 2015 the company announced that it had secured $75 million of private funding to allow the project to move forward from feasibility studies to development planning.

On June 11, 2022, CEO Carlos Aguilar stepped down after leading Texas Central since December 2016. As of Aguilar's resignation, the company lacks any top management.

Route
On August 10, 2015, the U.S. Department of Transportation and Federal Railroad Administration (FRA) issued a report that supported the so-called utility corridor for the line. In December 2017, the FRA further released their draft environment impact statement for the High-Speed Rail that proposed the preferred route.

From the station in Dallas, located on the west side of The Cedars with pedestrian walkways connecting to Kay Bailey Hutchison Convention Center, the route runs on elevated tracks parallel to a BNSF Railway line leaving the Dallas-Fort Worth Metroplex. The line then proceeds through Ellis, Navarro, Freestone, Limestone, Leon, and Madison counties. One intermediate station is planned for unincorporated Grimes County in order to serve the cities of Bryan-College Station and Huntsville, Texas, which includes more than 100,000 students at Texas A&M University (the state's largest), Blinn College, and Sam Houston State University, combined. The line then passes through Waller County before entering Harris County and the Houston area. The train line would run parallel to U.S. 290, Hempstead Highway and another Union Pacific Railroad freight line before ending at the Houston station, site of the former Northwest Mall.

Rolling stock

The line was expected to use a variation of the N700 Series Shinkansen modified for export, referred to as the N700-I. However, following the launch of the N700S in Japan, focus has shifted onto this newer model. Its modular buildup makes it easier to change the train length from the 16 cars used in Japan and it is tested for higher top speeds, removing the need to perform expensive modifications.

Signalling 
The signaling of the line is likely to be a replica of the digital ATC system used on Tokaido Shinkansen.

Construction plans and contractors
In January 2017, President Donald Trump's administration listed the project as a national transportation infrastructure priority.

In June 2017, it was stated that construction would begin in 2019 and would support 10,000 jobs during each year of the construction process and 1,500 permanent jobs once operations begin. In May 2018, Texas Central announced that global engineering firm Bechtel will work with bullet train developer Texas Central on project management. On September 13, 2018, the company earned a $300 million loan for permitting, design and engineering. The company selected Salini Impregilo and its U.S. subsidiary Lane Construction Company to lead the civil construction consortium that will build the Texas passenger line, to the top of the rails, including viaducts, embankments and drainage.

In January 2018, plans for the station in Dallas were released as the preferred location identified by the Federal Railroad Administration in their Draft Environmental Impact Statement.

In October 2018, Texas Central named Spanish railway company Renfe Operadora as the train's operating partner. The operator will run the trains; maintain system components, such as the engines, signals and other equipment; oversee ticketing, passenger loyalty programs and other services. In September 2019, Texas Central signed a further design-build contract with the joint venture Salini-Lane to lead the effort to supply the civil infrastructure scope of design, construction and installation as well as the design and construction of the viaduct and embankment sections along the entire route, the installation of the track system and the alignment and construction of all buildings and services along the route that will house maintenance and other rail system equipment. Construction is slated to begin as early as 2021 and end in 2026.

In February 2019, Texas Central announced that it had contracted Resource Environmental Solutions (RES) for ecological mitigation services to help protect and enhance natural ecosystems and the environmental throughout construction and operations. Also that month, Texas Central named Citi and MUFG as its financial advisers to spearhead its capital-raising efforts. The Federal permitting the Record of Decision was due by March 27, 2020, and a $5.9 billion design and operation contract was awarded to Renfe in February 2020. FRA regulatory approvals came in September 2020, with construction expected to commence relatively shortly thereafter.

In June 2021, the $16 billion design and construction contract for the line itself was awarded to Webuild, with construction expected to begin in late 2021 or early 2022.

In September 2021, the CEO of Texas Central, Carlos Aguilar, stated in an interview that there was a 50/50 chance that construction would commence within 6 months, and that much depended on a major infrastructure bill passing the US Congress.

Legal issues 
The right-of-way to be acquired from private property owners is a significant factor for the project. Ranchers living along the proposed route have challenged the company's attempts to survey and construct the line, questioning their right to eminent domain. Grimes County has opposed the project.

Texas Central Railroad filed a lawsuit against a landowner that refused to allow survey crews onto his land.  The railroad filed for summary judgment in the case, Texas Central Railroad and Infrastructure vs Calvin House, arguing that it was entitled to require private landowners to allow land surveys for possible future eminent domain purchases under Texas state law.  However, in a December 2016 ruling, a Harris County court denied the railroad's petition for summary judgment.

In February 2019, a Leon County District Judge ruled that Texas Central is not a railroad company and therefore does not have the right to conduct surveys on private land.

In July 2019, Texas's 14th Court of Appeals reversed a previous decision by a lower court which granted summary judgment and issued a permanent injunction in Grimes County's public-nuisance suit against Texas Central and Pacheco Koch Consulting Engineers, Inc.

In May 2020, Texas's 13th Court of Appeals ruled that Texas Central Railroad and Infrastructure, Inc. and Integrated Texas Logistics, Inc.) are both railroad companies and interurban electric railways.

The case James Fredrick Miles v. Texas Central Railroad and Integrated Texas Logistics, Inc. was appealed to the Supreme Court of Texas. The Ellis County commissioners' court, and other counties along the proposed route which oppose high-speed rail, filed an amicus brief in support of the challenge to the project. On June 18, 2021, the state supreme court denied review without comment, thereby letting stand the lower appellate court's ruling. A motion for rehearing was filed by the landowner on July 29, 2021, which was followed by numerous amicus curiae letters weighing in on the merits of the project.

On October 15, 2021, the Texas Supreme Court withdrew its denial, reinstated the petition, and set the case for oral argument on January 11, 2022. The key legal issue is whether Texas Central qualifies as a "railroad company" or an "interurban electric railway," and whether an entity must show reasonable probability of project completion to invoke eminent domain authority under Texas Rice Land Partners, LTD. v. Denbury Green Pipeline-Texas, LLC, 363 S.W.3d 192 (Tex. 2012).

On July 16, 2020, the federal Surface Transportation Board ruled that Texas Central Railroad is part of the interstate rail network based on its through-ticketing with Amtrak, and therefore subject to the STB's jurisdiction.

In June 2022, the Supreme Court of Texas ruled 5–3 that Texas Central has eminent domain authority on land that is needed to build the rail line.

See also

High-speed rail in Texas
South Central Corridor
Brightline West
California High-Speed Rail

References

External links
 
 Dallas to Houston High-Speed Rail – Passenger Service from Houston to Dallas – Federal Railroad Administration

2026 in rail transport
High-speed railway lines in the United States
Proposed railway lines in Texas
Texas Central Railway
Railway electrification in the United States
Projects established in 2009
High-speed rail in the United States